190 A.D. is a year.

190 may also refer to:
 190 (number), the natural number following 189 and preceding 191
 U.S. Route 190, also known as the Ronald Reagan Memorial Highway, is an east–west United States highway in Louisiana and Texas
 Mercedes-Benz 190 (disambiguation)
 Interstate 190 (Massachusetts), runs for 19.26 miles (31.00 km) north from I-290 in Worcester, Massachusetts to Route 2 in Leominster, Massachusetts
 Interstate 190 (New York), runs 28.34 miles (45.61 km) from I-90 near Buffalo, New York to Lewiston, New York via Niagara Falls
 Interstate 190 (Illinois), Illinois Tollway system
 Interstate 190 (South Dakota), an auxiliary Interstate Highway in the U.S. state of South Dakota
 Connecticut Route 190, a state route in the northern part of the U.S. state of Connecticut
 Missouri Route 190, Supplemental
 Georgia State Route 190, Former
 PowerBook 190, laptop computers manufactured by Apple Computer as part of their PowerBook brand, introduced to the market in August 1995
 190 BC, a year of the pre-Julian Roman calendar
 No. 190 Squadron RAF, a Royal Air Force squadron with a relative short existence, but a very broad career. It served as a trainer squadron during the first World War and as convoy escort, airborne support and transport squadron during World War II
 Mexican Federal Highway 190 (Fed 190), a free (libre) part of the federal highways corridors (los corredores carreteros federales) of Mexico
 190 (New Jersey bus)